William Renán Sosa Altamira (born 21 April 1957) is a Mexican politician affiliated with the PRI. As of 2013 he served as Deputy of the LXII Legislature of the Mexican Congress representing Yucatán.

References

1957 births
Living people
Institutional Revolutionary Party politicians
21st-century Mexican politicians
Deputies of the LXII Legislature of Mexico
Members of the Chamber of Deputies (Mexico) for Yucatán